Krishna Udayasankar is a Singapore-based Indian author, known for her modern retelling of Mahabharata through the novel cycle, The Aryavarta Chronicles (Govinda, Kaurava and Kurukshetra). She is also the author of Immortal, 3 - a novel on the founding of Singapore - and Objects of Affection – a book of prose-poems.

Personal life and education
A graduate of the National Law School of India University (NLSIU), Bangalore, Krishna holds a PhD in Strategic Management from the Nanyang Business School, Singapore and has published two textbooks: International Business: An Asian Perspective (2015) and Global Business Today (2014). Her book Beast (2019), an urban fantasy thriller is published by Penguin Random House, who have also taken over the rights for her entire backlist of five novels. In a session at the Bangalore Literary Festival in 2018, Udayasankar spoke of how she started writing fiction entirely by accident, and that her first work, The Aryavarta Chronicles, started out as a satirical poem.
 
Krishna lives in Singapore with her family.

Books
Govinda (novel) (Hachette India, 2012)
Objects of Affection (poetry anthology) (Math Paper Press, 2013)
Body Boundaries: The Etiquette Anthology of Women's Writing (non-fiction) (The Literary Centre,2013)
Kaurava (novel) (Hachette India, 2013)
Kurukshetra (novel) (Hachette India, 2014)
 3 (novel) (Hachette, 2015)
 Immortal (Hachette India, 2016) 
 Beast (Penguin India, 2019)
 Buddha (Penguin India, TBA)- Forthcoming
 The Cowherd Prince

References

External links
 The Aryavarta Chronicles
 Krishna Udayasankar at Penguin India

Indian women novelists
English-language writers from India
Mythopoeic writers
Tamil diaspora
Indian diaspora in Singapore
Tamil writers
Year of birth missing (living people)
Living people
Writers from Bangalore
Nanyang Technological University alumni
Academic staff of Nanyang Technological University
Novelists from Karnataka